Dennis Vos (born 28 November 2001) is a Dutch professional footballer who plays as a left-back for FC Emmen.

Career

PSV
Vos joined PSV's academy in 2010 from RKSV Nuenen. He signed his first professional contract in June 2019; a three-year deal. He made his debut for Jong PSV on 26 August 2020 in a 6–1 loss to Excelsior in the Eerste Divisie, starting at left-back. He scored his first goal on 23 October in a 2–1 defeat against De Graafschap.

Vos signed a one-year contract extension February 2022, keeping him at the club until 2023. At that point, he had become the team captain of Jong PSV under head coach Ruud van Nistelrooy.

On 15 May 2022, Vos made his debut for the PSV first team on the final matchday of the 2021–22 Eredivisie season, coming on as a half-time substitute for Philipp Max in a 2–1 victory against PEC Zwolle.

FC Emmen
In January 2023, Vos signed for FC Emmen on an eighteen-month contract with the option for a further year.

Career statistics

References

2001 births
Living people
Dutch footballers
Netherlands youth international footballers
Association football defenders
Association football midfielders
RKSV Nuenen players
PSV Eindhoven players
Jong PSV players
FC Emmen players
Eerste Divisie players
Eredivisie players